Conus ariejoostei is a species of sea snail, a marine gastropod mollusk in the family Conidae, the cone snails, cone shells or cones.

These snails are predatory and venomous. They are capable of "stinging" humans.

Description

Distribution
This marine species of cone snail is endemic to South Africa and occurs off the East Coast Province.

References

 Veldsman S.G. (2016). Description of four new Sciteconus species (Gastropoda: Conidae): S. ariejoostei nov. sp., S. xhosa nov. sp., S. velliesi nov. sp. & S. nahoonensis nov. sp. from the East Coast Province, South Africa. Malacologia Mostra Mondiale. 92: 26-35.page(s): 28

External links
 

Endemic fauna of South Africa
ariejoostei
Gastropods described in 2016